Turiwára is an extinct Tupi–Guaraní language of the state of Pará, in the Amazon region of Brazil.

References

Tupi–Guarani languages